FM Records was an American folk and jazz record label founded in 1963 by Monte Kay and Pete Kameron.

History
Kay was the manager of Chris Connor and Herbie Mann, among others, and erstwhile husband of Diahann Carroll. Pete Kameron was the manager of The Weavers and an advisor to The Tarriers. Kay and Kameron formed a partnership called Village Planners and from this partnership they started FM Records. Kameron and Kay ended up being listed as producers on many of the FM albums, along with Alan Douglas (who also was responsible for the op-art record jackets). The output of FM was a mixture of jazz and folk releases. The label was distributed by Vee Jay initially, and later by Roulette.

Kay and Kameron lost no time in signing up people they knew. Chris Connor, who had had several successful albums for Atlantic, was talked into leaving Atlantic for the fledgling FM label, where she recorded two albums — and possibly a third (unreleased but bootlegged) album — before the label folded in 1964. Kay also released a various artists album featuring a song by Herbie Mann. Other jazz artists included arranger Bill Russo, Eric Dolphy, and spoken-word artist Ken Nordine.

On the folk side, Kameron signed Jo Mapes, Fred Neil, Len Chandler and ex-Tarrier Bob Carey. There was also a new folk group called the Big 3, a trio composed of future Mamas & Papas star Cass Elliot along with folk singer Jim Hendricks and future solo star Tim Rose. In Rose's debut solo album for Columbia a few years later, he remade several songs he had done with the Big 3, and recorded a slow arrangement of "Hey Joe" that Jimi Hendrix copied almost note for note a few months later from the edited 45 version. In addition, Kameron signed husband-and-wife team Jake and Kate Holmes, recording under the pseudonym Allen & Grier, who did parodies. Jake Holmes later had a minor hit in 1970 with "So Close" [Polydor 14041, #49], but is perhaps better known as the alleged source of Led Zeppelin's "Dazed and Confused."

By the time album #307 came out in late 1963, the label was already showing early signs of a money crunch. The label used for the albums had a complex graphic design, but when the Big 3 started selling more than expected, they ran out of label blanks and were forced to go to a less expensive label, in black and grey with no graphics. By the time #311 was issued in 1964, they were in trouble. Although plans had been made for the albums numbered 312 to 319, many were not issued, and the ones that were are scarce today. Jo Mapes was quoted as saying that while the copies of her album (#317) were on the docks ready to ship, the company went bankrupt. The albums that had been pressed were sold to cutout wholesalers. Most of the copies existing today of albums #311 to #319 were salvaged from the bargain bins of the 1960s and have cutout holes in the covers (or "NR" stamped on the back meaning they were not returnable) and stickers on the front reading "39 cents" and such.

Vee-Jay, their first distributor, released some of the masters on their own label, such as the Big 3 on Tollie 9006 ["Winkin' Blinkin' and Nod"/"The Banjo Song"], and the Eric Dolphy album, which they reissued several times on Vee-Jay and Epitaph (see related discographies). Ultimately, other than the Eric Dolphy album, most of the other masters seemed to end up with Roulette. In 1968, some of the FM masters were reissued by Roulette, such as the Big 3 albums and some of the jazz issues, and later they were reissued on CD via the companies who issued Roulette Jazz recordings and licensed material from the Roulette catalog.

Roster
 Chris Connor
 The Big 3
 Allen & Grier
 Fred Neil

Jazz record labels
Folk record labels
Record labels established in 1963